Women's Gymnasium may refer to:

Hearst Gymnasium for Women, Berkeley, California, listed on the National Register of Historic Places (NRHP) in Alameda County
Women's Gymnasium (Gainesville, Florida), NRHP-listed
Women's Gymnasium, Northwestern State University, Natchitoches, Louisiana, NRHP-listed in Natchitoches Parish
Women's Gymnasium, University of Illinois at Urbana-Champaign, Urbana, Illinois, NRHP-listed in Champaign County

See also
Men's Gymnasium (disambiguation)